The Prude's Fall is a 1925 British silent drama film directed by Graham Cutts and starring Jane Novak, Julanne Johnston and Warwick Ward.

The film was shot at Islington Studios, produced by a company that would soon develop into Gainsborough Pictures. It was an adaptation of a play by Rudolph Besier and May Edington with the screenplay written by Alfred Hitchcock. Its German title is Seine zweite Frau. It was also known by the alternative title of Dangerous Virtue.

It was not very well regarded. Iris Barry's review in the Daily Mail ran as follows: "An English picture, not of first-rate quality, but with an interesting cast."

Cast
 Jane Novak as Beatrice Audley 
 Julanne Johnston as Sonia Roubetsky 
 Warwick Ward as Andre le Briquet 
 Hugh Miller as Marquis de Rocqueville 
 Gladys Jennings as Laura Westonry 
 Miles Mander as Sir Neville Moreton 
 Henry Vibart as Dean Carey 
 Marie Ault as Mrs Masters

uncredited
Betty Compson

References

Bibliography
 Chapman, Gary. London's Hollywood: The Gainsborough Studio in the Silent Years. Edditt, 2014.
 Maurice Yacowar & Barry Keith Grant. Hitchcock's British Films. Wayne State University Press, 2010.

External links

1925 films
1925 drama films
British films based on plays
Films directed by Graham Cutts
British drama films
Islington Studios films
British silent feature films
Gainsborough Pictures films
British black-and-white films
1920s English-language films
1920s British films
Silent drama films